Joel Fuhrman (born December 2, 1953) is an American celebrity doctor who advocates a plant-based diet termed the nutritarian diet which emphasizes nutrient dense foods.  His practice is based on his nutrition-based approach to obesity and chronic disease, as well as promoting his products and books. He has written books promoting his dietary approaches including the bestsellers Eat to Live, Super Immunity, The Eat to Live Cookbook, The End of Dieting (2016) and The End of Heart Disease (2016). He sells a related line of nutrition related products.

Life and career
Fuhrman was born in New York City, on December 2, 1953.  He is Jewish. He was a competitor in the amateur figure skating circuit.  He was a member of the US World Figure Skating Team and placed second in the US National Pairs Championship in 1973. In 1973, he suffered a heel injury which prevented him from competing. Fuhrman claims that an alternative medicine therapy recommended by a naturopath helped speed his recovery, and led him to become interested in alternative medicine. He came in 3rd place at the 1976 World Professional Pairs Skating Championship in Jaca, Spain, skating with his sister, Gale Fuhrman, but due to short-term massive muscle loss from fasting was unable to make the Olympic team.  In 1988, he graduated from the University of Pennsylvania School of Medicine. Fuhrman is a board-certified family physician and serves as Director of Research for the Nutritional Research Foundation.

Diet and health

Nutritarian diet

Fuhrman has advocated eating at least one pound of raw vegetables and another pound of cooked vegetables each day with an emphasis on green vegetables along with beans, onions, mushrooms, berries, nuts and seeds. He also recommends eating at least one cup of beans a day to benefit from the resistant starch and increased satiety. The Nutritarian diet encourages whole plant foods and restricts dairy products, meat, snacks between meals, fruit juice, vegetable oils and processed foods.

Furhman's Nutritarian diet excludes dairy and meat for six weeks, but after this period a small amount of chicken and fish can be eaten. Fuhrman also allows a limited amount of low-fat dairy products, olive oil and refined carbohydrates on the diet after six weeks. If animal products are not added back into the diet, Furhman recommends vitamin B12, vitamin D and omega 3 supplements. On the Nutritarian diet, dairy products, eggs and fish are to make up less than 10% of calories whilst legumes make between 10% to 40% and raw and cooked vegetables make between 30% and 60% of calories.

Nutrient density

Fuhrman popularized the notion of nutrient density in what he calls the Health Equation: Health = Nutrients/Calories (abbreviated as H = N/C). Peter Lipson, a physician and writer on alternative medicine, has been heavily critical of Fuhrman's health equation, writing that since its terms cannot be quantified, it is "nothing more than a parlor trick". Fuhrman created what he calls the "Aggregate Nutrient Density Index" or ANDI, a ranking of foods based on his claims of micronutrient concentration and kale is at the top of this list. Whole Foods began using the scores as a marketing project and reported that the sales of high scoring foods "skyrocketed".

Reception

Fuhrman has heavily marketed his products and his infomercials have "become a staple during the self-improvement bloc of PBS pledge drives." In the October 2012 edition of Men's Journal, Mark Adams stated that Fuhrman "preaches something closer to fruitarianism or Christian Science than to conventional medical wisdom".  Adams also reported that Fuhrman believes that the flu vaccine "isn't effective at all". David Gorski has commented that Fuhrman has promoted a vitalistic view of food and the pseudoscientific idea of detoxification.

Dietician Carolyn Williams has described Fuhrman's Nutritarian diet as a fad diet. According to Williams "This can be helpful for people who feel stuck in their weight loss journey and want to totally reset or detox their diet following a holiday or vacation. Although this diet is marketed as an eating pattern, it is essentially a fad diet. Those who do try this diet should go into it knowing that it is not sustainable for everyone long-term, and is only a temporary quick fix to lose weight."

Harriet Hall of Science-Based Medicine who reviewed Fuhrman's Nutritarian diet commented that he tends to incorrectly assume association studies show causation and that his diet has not been tested in controlled trials. Hall stated that "Fuhrman makes extraordinary claims for the Nutritarian diet, but extraordinary claims must be supported by extraordinary evidence, and the evidence he presents is far from compelling."

See also
 Neal D. Barnard
 T. Colin Campbell
 Michael Greger
 Michael Klaper
 John A. McDougall

References

External links

 
 

1953 births
Alternative detoxification promoters
American health and wellness writers
American male pair skaters
American medical researchers
American medical writers
American male non-fiction writers
American nutritionists
American primary care physicians
Living people
People in alternative medicine
Perelman School of Medicine at the University of Pennsylvania alumni
Plant-based diet advocates
Pseudoscientific diet advocates
Writers from New Jersey
Celebrity doctors
Family physicians
American male single skaters